The Hawaii Academy of Arts and Science (HAAS) is a charter school based in Pahoa, Hawaii. It was founded on June 21, 2001, and serves grades K-12. The governing board chairperson is Michael Dodge, and the current principal is Steve Hirakami. The First day of classes was September 12, 2001; the original school day was scheduled for September Eleventh but was cancelled due to the September 11 attacks.

Mission statement
"The purpose of the Hawaii Academy of Arts & Science is to educate and enrich the whole person and prepare the individual to respond to his or her own needs and those of our global community".

Significant Alumni
Sir Pono Christianson

References

Charter K-12 schools in the United States
Charter schools in Hawaii
Educational institutions established in 2001
2001 establishments in Hawaii
Public K-12 schools in Hawaii
K-12 schools in Hawaii County, Hawaii